Khour may refer to:

 Khour, India
 Khur, Iran (disambiguation)